Roland Guillon (born 1942) is a French sociologist, known both for his work on the problems of employment and capital, and particularly, for his innovative approach to jazz.

He is a research engineer at the centre of economics and ethics of environment and development of the Versailles Saint-Quentin-en-Yvelines University. Employment and training specialist, he undertook several missions in West Africa.

He is at the origin of the definition "New Wave" in jazz. Inspired by the so-called "New Thing" in the late 1950s, he believes that the term is inappropriate and replace "thing" by "wave", a word which says movement, perhaps to signify the permanence of the swing. More than movement, this wave is a strength, power expressed by a whole new wave musicians.

This currently now wants synthesis of two main styles of jazz, hard bop and free jazz. This is actually less than an addition. Thus, composers or performers are new wave of artists who are involved in the two streams, but not only.

In The New Wave, jazz in between, Roland Guillon established a chronology of style analysis and multiple key disks to understanding the movement. Ornette Coleman, John Coltrane and Don Cherry are illustrious members, as well as lesser-known musicians such as Prince Lasha.

Bibliography

Sociology 

 Les Syndicats dans les mutations et la crise de l'emploi (Unions in mutations and employment crisis), Paris, L'Harmattan, 1997
 Environnement et emploi : quelles approches syndicales ? (Environment and employment: what approaches a union?), Paris, L'Harmattan, 1998
 Recherches sur l'emploi, éléments de sociologie de l'activité économique (Research on employment, elements of sociology of economic activity), Paris, L'Harmattan, 1999
 Syndicats et mondialisation, une stratification de l'union syndical (Unions and globalization, stratification of the labor union), Paris, L'Harmattan, 2000
 Formation continue et mutation de l'emploi (Training and employment change), Paris, L'Harmattan, 2002
 Regards croisés sur le capital social (Perspectives on social capital), Paris, L'Harmattan, 2003
 Les Tensions sur l'activité en Afrique de l'ouest (Tensions on the activity in West Africa), Paris, L'Harmattan, 2004
 Classes dirigeantes et universités dans la mondialisation (Ruling classes and universities in globalization), Paris, L'Harmattan, 2004
 Sociologie de l'activité, une lecture critique de la globalisation (Sociology of work, a critical reading of globalization), Paris, L'Harmattan, 2005
 Les Avatars d'une pensée dirigeante, le cas du parti socialiste (Avatars of thought leadership, the case of the Socialist Party), Paris, L'Harmattan, 2006

Jazz 

 Le Hard Bop, un style de jazz (Hard Bop, a style of jazz), Paris, L'Harmattan, 1999
 Le Jazz de quatre cités, Hard bopper de Chicago (The four cities of Jazz, Hard bopper from Chicago), Détroit, Pittsburgh et Philadelphie, Paris, L'Harmattan, 2001
 Musiciens de jazz new-yorkais, Le hard bopper (Jazz musicians of New York, the hard bopper), Paris, L'Harmattan, 2003
 Anthologie du Hard Bop, L'éclat du jazz noir américain (Hard Bop Anthology, The brightness of the black American jazz), Paris, L'Harmattan, 2005
 La New Wave, un jazz de l'entre deux (The New Wave, a jazz of the two), Paris, L'Harmattan, 2007
 L'empreinte de Parker, Gillespie et Ellington sur le jazz des années 1950-1960 (The footprint of Parker, Gillespie and Ellington on the jazz of the 1950s–1960s), Paris, L'Harmattan, 2011

References

French sociologists
21st-century French non-fiction writers
Academic staff of Versailles Saint-Quentin-en-Yvelines University
Living people
1942 births
French male writers